Aníbal Vega Borges is a Puerto Rican politician and was mayor of Toa Baja until June 30, 2016. He also served as a member of the Puerto Rico House of Representatives from 1993 to 2005.

Early life and education 
He completed his secondary education at the Caribbean University at Bayamon.  While working in private enterprise and public service, he continued his studies in the Pontifical Catholic University of Puerto Rico Ponce. In 1986, he obtained the degree of Juris Doctor. Exercise in private practice at the same time that continued graduate studies at the Pontifical Catholic University of Puerto Rico and at the University of Valladolid in Spain, obtaining the PhD in law.

Political career 
Vega Borges was elected as a representative for District 10 at the 1992 general elections. He was reelected in 1996 and 2000.

Vega Borges was elected as mayor of Toa Baja at the 2004 general elections. He was reelected in 2008 receiving more than 70% of the votes. He was the mayor with the largest margin of victory.

In 2016, Vega Borges was defeated by Bernardo Márquez García at the PNP primaries. The defeat was classified by a local newspaper as "the surprise of the primary". On June 23, 2016, Vega Borges announced his resignation after being appointed by Ricky Rosselló as Electoral Commissioner for the Party.

References 

|-

Living people
New Progressive Party (Puerto Rico) politicians
Mayors of places in Puerto Rico
1957 births
People from Toa Baja, Puerto Rico
Pontifical Catholic University of Puerto Rico alumni
University of Valladolid alumni